Czas zdrady (Time of Betrayal) is a Polish historical film directed by Wojciech Marczewski. It was released in 1997.

Cast 

 Janusz Gajos as Machiavelli Niccolo 
 Jerzy Radziwiłowicz as Savonarola Girolamo
 Krzysztof Wakuliński as envoy 
 Marek Siudym as soldier
 Jan Marciniak as doorman
 Agnieszka Krukówna as Rosana
 Mariusz Benoit as Alberti
 Leon Charewicz as Matteo
 Rafał Mohr as Tonino
 Jakub Penier as Carlitto
 Andrzej Żółkiewski as soldier
 Henryk Gołębiewski as soldier
 Jarosław Nowikowski as rider
 Adam Hejger as rider

References

External links
 

1997 films
Polish historical films
1990s Polish-language films
Films directed by Wojciech Marczewski
1990s historical films